The World Box Lacrosse Championship (WBLC), formerly known as the World Indoor Lacrosse Championship (WILC), is an international box lacrosse tournament sponsored by World Lacrosse that is held every four years. Since the first tournament in 2003, Canada has won all five gold medals and is undefeated in all games. Canada hosted the first two tournaments in 2003 and 2007, the Czech Republic hosted in 2011, the Onondaga Nation, south of Syracuse, New York, hosted in 2015. The 2019 WILC was held in Langley, British Columbia, Canada.

The winner of the WBLC wins the Cockerton Cup, named for All-American lacrosse player Stan Cockerton.

Champions 

Source:

Medal table

Performance by team

Performance by tournament

2003 Indoor Championship 

Final: Canada 21, Iroquois 4
3rd place: United States 15, Scotland 9
5th place: Australia 21, Czech Republic 10

2007 Indoor Championship 

	
Final: Canada 15, Iroquois 14, OT
3rd place: United States 17, England 10
5th place: Scotland 14, Australia 8
7th place: Czech Republic 22, Ireland 5

2011 Indoor Championship 

Final: Canada 13, Iroquois 6
3rd place: United States 16, Czech Republic 7
5th place: England 23, Australia 8
7th place: Ireland 17, Slovakia 15 (2 game aggregate)

Source:

2015 Indoor Championship 

Final: Canada 12, Iroquois 8
3rd place: United States 15, Israel 4
5th place: England 14, Ireland 12
7th place: Czech Republic 20, Australia 11
9th place: Finland 24, Turkey 6
11th place: Germany 13, Serbia 12

Source:

See also
 Federation of International Lacrosse
 Women's Lacrosse World Cup
 Under-19 World Lacrosse Championships (men and women)
 World Junior Lacrosse Championship (men)
 European Box Lacrosse Championships (men)
 Box lacrosse

References

External links
 Federation of International Lacrosse

 
Indoor
Recurring sporting events established in 2003
Quadrennial sporting events